Joshua Okine (born 6 March 1980, in Accra), is a Ghanaian professional welter/light middle/middleweight boxer of the 2000s and 2010s who won the Ghanaian welterweight title, World Boxing Federation (WBF) welterweight title, International Boxing Federation (IBF) Inter-Continental welterweight title, and Commonwealth welterweight title, his professional fighting weight varied from , i.e. welterweight to , i.e. middleweight.

References

External links

Image - Joshua Okine

1980 births
Light-welterweight boxers
Living people
Middleweight boxers
Boxers from Accra
Welterweight boxers
Ghanaian male boxers